The 1994–95 NBA season was the Bulls' 29th season in the National Basketball Association. This was also the team's first season playing at the United Center. During the off-season, the Bulls signed free agents Ron Harper, and Jud Buechler. The Bulls struggled in the first half of the season with a 23–25 record at the All-Star break. However, there were rumors that retired All-Star guard Michael Jordan would come out of his retirement to rejoin the team, after an unsuccessful baseball career. The Bulls received a major boost upon Jordan's return, as he faxed a memo that simply said "I'm back." The Bulls won 24 of their final 34 games, and finished the season with a 47–35 record, going 13–4 with Jordan back in the lineup. The Bulls finished third in the Central Division and fifth in the Eastern Conference.

Jordan averaged 26.9 points, 6.9 rebounds, 5.3 assists and 1.8 steals per game in 17 games, but only shot just .411 in field-goal percentage. One notable highlight of the season was Jordan scoring a season-high of 55 points in a 113–111 road win against the New York Knicks on March 28, 1995. He also changed his jersey number to #45, but later on changed it back to #23 during the playoffs. In addition, Scottie Pippen led the team with 21.4 points, 8.1 rebounds, 5.2 assists, 2.9 steals and 1.1 blocks per game. He was named to the All-NBA First Team, NBA All-Defensive First Team, and was selected for the 1995 NBA All-Star Game. Second-year forward Toni Kukoč provided the team with 15.7 points, 5.4 rebounds and 4.6 assists per game, while B.J. Armstrong provided with 14.0 points per game, three-point specialist Steve Kerr contributed 8.2 points per game and shot .524 in three-point field goal percentage off the bench, and Will Perdue averaged 8.0 points and 6.7 rebounds per game. Harper, who usually averaged around 20 points per game with the Cleveland Cavaliers and Los Angeles Clippers, only averaged just 6.9 points per game with the Bulls this season. Pippen also finished in seventh place in Most Valuable Player voting, and in second place in Defensive Player of the Year voting.

The Bulls defeated the 4th-seeded Charlotte Hornets three games to one in the Eastern Conference First Round of the 1995 NBA Playoffs, but would eventually lose in the Eastern Conference Semi-finals to the Eastern Conference champion Orlando Magic in six games. The Magic eventually went to the NBA Finals, but were unable to stop the 6th-seeded and eventual two-time NBA Champion Houston Rockets, as they were swept in four straight hard-fought games.

Following the season, Armstrong left in the 1995 NBA Expansion Draft, while Perdue was traded to the San Antonio Spurs, and Pete Myers was released to free agency.

Draft picks

Roster

Regular season

Season standings

Record vs. opponents

Game log

|- bgcolor="#bbffbb"
| 1
| November 4
| Charlotte
| W 89–83
| Scottie Pippen (22)
| Will Perdue (12)
| Ron Harper (6)
| United Center22,313
| 1–0
|- bgcolor="#ffcccc"
| 2
| November 5
| Washington
| L 100–99 (OT)
| Scottie Pippen (29)
| Scottie Pippen  (14)
| Scottie Pippen (6)
| United Center22,186
| 1–1
|- bgcolor="#bbffbb"
| 3
| November 7
| Philadelphia
| W 98–83
| Toni Kukoč (28)
| Scottie Pippen (10)
| Scottie Pippen (5)
| United Center22,122
| 2–1
|- bgcolor="#ffcccc"
| 4
| November 9
| @ New Jersey
| L 110–109
| Scottie Pippen (28)
| Will Perdue (9)
| Scottie Pippen (6)
| Brendan Byrne Arena20,049
| 2–2
|- bgcolor="#bbffbb"
| 5
| November 11
| @ Minnesota
| W 112–100
| Scottie Pippen (22)
| Perdue, Pippen (8)
| Kukoč, Pippen  (5)
| Target Center15,109
| 3–2
|- bgcolor="#ffcccc"
|- bgcolor="#ffcccc"
| 6
| November 12
| Dallas
| L 124–120
| Scottie Pippen (26)
| Will Perdue (12)
| Scottie Pippen (5)
| United Center22,195
| 3–3
|- bgcolor="#bbffbb"
| 7
| November 16
| @ San Antonio
| W 94–92
| Ron Harper (27)
| Scottie Pippen  (7)
| Scottie Pippen (9)
| Alamodome16,059
| 4–3
|- bgcolor="#ffcccc"
| 8
| November 17
| @ Houston
| L 106–83
| Scottie Pippen (15)
| Pippen, Wennington (6)
| Scottie Pippen (6)
| The Summit16,199
| 4–4
|- bgcolor="#bbffbb"
| 9
| November 19
| @ Dallas
| W 111–85
| Scottie Pippen (36)
| Scottie Pippen (14)
| Toni Kukoč (5)
| Reunion Arena17,502
| 5–4
|- bgcolor="#bbffbb"
| 10
| November 22
| @ L.A. Clippers
| W 105–93
| Ron Harper (21)
| Scottie Pippen (8)
| Scottie Pippen (10)
| Los Angeles Memorial Sports Arena9,080
| 6–4
|- bgcolor="#ffcccc"
| 11
| November 23
| @ Denver
| L 113–111
| Scottie Pippen (29)
| Foster, Wennington (6)
| B.J. Armstrong (5)
| McNichols Sports Arena17,171
| 6–5
|- bgcolor="#ffcccc"
| 12
| November 25
| @ Utah
| L 124–94
| Scottie Pippen (15)
| Dickey Simpkins (7)
| Armstrong, Pippen (4)
| Delta Center19,911
| 6–6
|- bgcolor="#bbffbb"
| 13
| November 30
| @ Phoenix
| W 118–105
| Scottie Pippen (35)
| Scottie Pippen (9)
| Myers, Pippen (6)
| America West Arena22,414
| 7–6

|- align="center" bgcolor="#ccffcc"
| 39
| January 22 12 Noon CST
| Houston
| W 100–81
| Armstrong (20)
| Perdue (11)
| Pippen (6)
| United Center22,647
| 20–19

|- align="center"
|colspan="9" bgcolor="#bbcaff"|All-Star Break
|- style="background:#cfc;"
|- bgcolor="#bbffbb"

Playoffs

|- align="center" bgcolor="#ccffcc"
| 1
| April 28
| @ Charlotte
| W 108–100 (OT)
| Michael Jordan (48)
| Michael Jordan (9)
| Toni Kukoč (9)
| Charlotte Coliseum23,859
| 1–0
|- align="center" bgcolor="#ffcccc"
| 2
| April 30
| @ Charlotte
| L 89–106
| Michael Jordan (32)
| Scottie Pippen (8)
| Michael Jordan (7)
| Charlotte Coliseum23,859
| 1–1
|- align="center" bgcolor="#ccffcc"
| 3
| May 2
| Charlotte
| W 103–80
| Michael Jordan (25)
| Jordan, Perdue (6)
| Scottie Pippen (9)
| United Center24,114
| 2–1
|- align="center" bgcolor="#ccffcc"
| 4
| May 4
| Charlotte
| W 85–84
| Jordan, Pippen (24)
| Toni Kukoč (11)
| Scottie Pippen (6)
| United Center24,221
| 3–1
|-

|- align="center" bgcolor="#ffcccc"
| 1
| May 7
| @ Orlando
| L 91–94
| Michael Jordan (19)
| Scottie Pippen (10)
| Jordan, Pippen (7)
| Orlando Arena16,010
| 0–1
|- align="center" bgcolor="#ccffcc"
| 2
| May 10
| @ Orlando
| W 104–94
| Michael Jordan (38)
| Kukoč, Perdue (8)
| Scottie Pippen (5)
| Orlando Arena16,010
| 1–1
|- align="center" bgcolor="#ffcccc"
| 3
| May 12
| Orlando
| L 101–110
| Michael Jordan (40)
| Scottie Pippen (12)
| Toni Kukoč (7)
| United Center24,281
| 1–2
|- align="center" bgcolor="#ccffcc"
| 4
| May 14
| Orlando
| W 106–95
| Michael Jordan (26)
| Jordan, Pippen (7)
| Toni Kukoč (9)
| United Center24,358
| 2–2
|- align="center" bgcolor="#ffcccc"
| 5
| May 16
| @ Orlando
| L 95–103
| Michael Jordan (39)
| Scottie Pippen (11)
| Toni Kukoč (6)
| Orlando Arena16,010
| 2–3
|- align="center" bgcolor="#ffcccc"
| 6
| May 18
| Orlando
| L 102–108
| Scottie Pippen (26)
| Scottie Pippen (12)
| Michael Jordan (7)
| United Center24,322
| 2–4
|-

Player statistics

NOTE: Please write the players statistics in alphabetical order by last name.

Regular Season

Playoffs

Awards and records
 Scottie Pippen, All-NBA First Team
 Scottie Pippen, NBA All-Defensive First Team

NBA All-Star Game
 Scottie Pippen, Forward

Transactions

References

 Bulls on Database Basketball
 Bulls on Basketball Reference

Chicago Bulls seasons
Chic
Chicago
Chicago